A collaboration between the Institute of Contemporary Art, Boston, and WGBH TV, Boston’s Public Television Station, The Contemporary Art Television (CAT) Fund was a special initiative seed funded for three years by the Massachusetts Council on the Arts and Humanities, 1983-1986.  Kathy Rae Huffman was appointed curator/producer of The CAT Fund with a mandate to create a context for artists to define television as a medium for their personal expression. The Fund was to increase visibility of artists work in the area of television, to create larger distribution markets for artists television/video, and to experiment in methods for funding and self-sustaining strategies for media arts production. In addition to events, special meetings of producers, and presentations, the following artists‘ projects were commissioned, and co-produced by The CAT Fund, 1984-1991 (in alphabetical order):  

 Laurie Anderson:  What You Mean We?  (video, produced in collaboration with Alive From Off Center, 1986)
 Burt Barr and James Benning:  O Panama (video co-produced with New TV Workshop 1985)
 Dara Birnbaum:  Will-O'-The-Wisp (video/installation, 1985)
 Peter D'Agostino:  String Cycles (interactive work, 1991)
 Ken Feingold:  Irony (TV narrative, 1985)
 Doug Hall:  Storm and Stress (video, 1986)
 Joan Jonas:  Double Lunar Dogs (video, 1984)
 Joan Logue:  New England Fisherman: Spots (video portraits, 1985) 
 Chip Lord and Mickey McGowen:  Easy Living (video, 1984)
 Branda Miller:  Time Squared (video for TIME CODE , 1987)
 Jacques Louise & Daniele Nyst:  L'Image (video and computer animation, 1987)
 Marcel Odenbach:  As If Memories Could Deceive Me (video and installation, 1986)
 Tony Oursler:  EVOL (video, 1984)
 Tony Oursler and Constance DeJong:  Relatives (video and performance, produced in collaboration with the exhibition BiNational: American Art of the Late 80’s, and toured internationally, 1988-1989)
 Daniel Reeves:  Ganapati / a spirit in the bush (video, 1986)
 Raul Ruiz: Expulsion of the Moors The (installation with video, co-produced with IVAM (Valencia) and the Galerie Nationale du Jeu de Paume, Paris, 1990)
 Bill Seaman:  The Watch Detail (interactive computer installation)
 Bill Seaman:  The Water  Catalogue (video, 1984) 
 Ilene Segalove:  More TV Stories (video, 1985)
 Michael Smith & William Wegman:  The World of Photography (video, produced in collaboration with “Alive From Off Center”, 1986)
 Bill Viola: I Do Not Know What it is I Am Like (video, video laserdisc co-produced with The Voyager Co., 1986)

In 1997, The DeCordova Museum presented The CAT Fund, as part of its HISTORY OF VIDEO ART IN BOSTON series. Part II: The 1980s.

References 

Contemporary art organizations
Organizations based in Boston